Ludovico Gonzaga (1588–1632) was a Roman Catholic prelate who served as Bishop of Alba (1619–1632). By birth, he was member of the House of Gonzaga.

Biography
Ludovico Gonzaga was born in Mantua, Italy in 1588 as the son of Marchese Prospero Gonzaga di Luzzara (1543-1614) and his wife, Isabella Gonzaga di Sabbioneta and Bozzolo (b. 1555).
On 12 August 1619, he was appointed during the papacy of Pope Paul V as Bishop of Alba.
On 18 August 1619, he was consecrated bishop by Benedetto Giustiniani, Cardinal-Bishop of Sabina, with Ulpiano Volpi, Archbishop Emeritus of Chieti, and Vincenzo Agnello Suardi, Coadjutor Bishop of Mantova, serving as co-consecrators. 
He served as Bishop of Alba until his death in 1632.

References

External links and additional sources
 (for Chronology of Bishops) 
 (for Chronology of Bishops) 

17th-century Italian Roman Catholic bishops
Bishops appointed by Pope Paul V
1588 births
1632 deaths